Mechanicsville is the name of four places in the Commonwealth of Virginia in the United States of America:
Mechanicsville, Hanover County, Virginia
Mechanicsville, Loudoun County, Virginia 
Mechanicsville, Rockbridge County, Virginia 
Mechanicsville, Rockingham County, Virginia